Constituency NA-146 may refer to:

 NA-146 (Pakpattan-II), a constituency (after 2018 delimitation) that covers Arif Wala Tehsil.
 NA-146 (Okara-IV), a former constituency based on 2002 delimitation

National Assembly Constituencies of Pakistan